Angela Rosina Farrow  (born 1951) is a New Zealand academic and writer for theatre and radio. Born in the United Kingdom, Farrow was appointed professor emerita at Massey University in November 2022. She was promoted to full professor in 2011 and in the same year was awarded Massey University lecturer of the Year. Farrow has published books on the production of physical theatre as well as her own numerous plays for theatre and radio. In April 2015, her series of 10-minute-long sketches Together All Alone was performed at Bats Theatre in Wellington. In the 2021 New Year Honours, Farrow was appointed an Officer of the New Zealand Order of Merit, for services to the arts, particularly theatre.

Awards
The Pen is a Mighty Sword International Playwriting Competition, USA, 2007 
Bruce Wrenn Award for Outstanding Contribution to NZ Playwriting 
Globe Theatre Award for ‘Best New New Zealand Play’ 
Best Drama Script at the Auckland Short and Sweet Festival
Winner of Inspirato Playwriting Award, Canada
Best Wild Card at the Sydney Short and Sweet Festival
People's Choice Winner at the Inspirato Festival, Canada
People's Choice Award for Falling in Melbourne Short and Sweet Festival, Melbourne 
First Prize in The Three Leeches Playwriting Contest for Lifetime, USA
Best Script for Lifetime at the Singapore Short and Sweet Festival

Publications
Plays for Physical Theatre: Three plays for young adults with notes for their production
Plays for Physical Theatre II

Plays
Falling
Despatch 
New Zealand Lamb
Goodbye April
Happiness
Last Breath
Leo Rising
Lifetime
Nearly There
Replay
Tango Partner
Speed of Light
Follow Follow Follow
Before The Birds
Amnesia
August Moon
the river

References

External links 

 Angie Farrow – Massey University profile

1951 births
Living people
20th-century New Zealand dramatists and playwrights
New Zealand women dramatists and playwrights
Academic staff of the Massey University
20th-century New Zealand women writers
21st-century New Zealand dramatists and playwrights
21st-century New Zealand women writers
Officers of the New Zealand Order of Merit
English emigrants to New Zealand